is a platform game based on the license of bright-haired toys known as Troll dolls. A Sega Genesis version was planned but never released.

Gameplay
Each scrolling level is initially shrouded in an animated "mist" until they are cleared by running around platforms and ladders in any order, bringing color to an initially greyscale game tile. A brightly coloured background is revealed after the player makes the mist vanish into thin air.

Reception

Electronic Gaming Monthly gave Super Troll Islands a 6 out of 10 rating in their December 1993 review. Allgame gave the game a rating of 2.5 stars out of a possible 5 in their overview. In 1995, Total! ranked Super Troll Islands a 95th on their Top 100 SNES Games writing: "A big platformer that’s a bit weird."

References

External links

1994 video games
Cancelled Sega Genesis games
Dam dolls
Trolls (franchise)
Kemco games
Millennium Interactive games
Platform games
Side-scrolling video games
Super Nintendo Entertainment System games
Super Nintendo Entertainment System-only games
Video games based on toys
Video games scored by Richard Joseph
Video games developed in the United Kingdom
Single-player video games
ASC Games games